The Little Swanson River is a river in Sudbury District in northeastern Ontario, Canada. It is in the James Bay drainage basin, begins at an unnamed lake, and is a right tributary of the Swanson River.

Course
The river begins in geographic Racine Township and flows northeast through a series of small, unnamed lakes into geographic Floranna Township where it reaches Robson Lake. The river heads north into geographic Sadler Township, then geographic Lipsett Township, continues north, and reaches its mouth at the Swanson River. The Swanson River flows via the Chapleau River, the Kapuskasing River, the Mattagami River and the Moose River to James Bay.

References

Sources

Rivers of Sudbury District